Penitente or penitentes may refer to

 Penitente or penitent, any (typically Catholic) practitioner of ritual penance
 A member of the Penitente Brotherhood, a lay confraternity of Catholics in New Mexico
 A member of any historical penitent order
 Penitente (snow formation) or nieves penitentes, high-altitude snow formations that are hardened, elongated, closely spaced, and pointing towards the general direction of the sun
 Los Penitentes (Argentina), a ski resort
 The Penitentes, a lost 1915 silent film drama directed by Jack Conway and starring Orrin Johnson and Seena Owen.